Mary Jacobs may refer to:
 Mary Frick Garrett Jacobs, Baltimore socialite, philanthropist, and art collector
 Mary C. Jacobs, American horticulturalist and author